Pseudaidia is a genus of flowering plants belonging to the family Rubiaceae.

Its native range is India, Sri Lanka.

Species:
 Pseudaidia speciosa (Bedd.) Tirveng.

References

Rubiaceae
Rubiaceae genera